"Diced Pineapples" is a hip hop song by American rapper Rick Ross and features vocals from American rapper Wale and Canadian rapper Drake. It was released as the fourth single from Ross' fifth studio album God Forgives, I Don't on August 21, 2012. The song has reached various Billboard charts.

Music video 
A music video for "Diced Pineapples" was filmed in Anguilla, and premiered on BET's 106 & Park on October 9, 2012. Wale and Drake both make an appearance as well as several models including Bernice Burgos. It was directed by Director X.

Charts

Certifications

References 

2011 songs
2012 singles
Drake (musician) songs
Rick Ross songs
Wale (rapper) songs
Music videos directed by Director X
Songs written by Drake (musician)
Songs written by Rick Ross
Maybach Music Group singles
Songs written by Wale (rapper)
Def Jam Recordings singles
Songs written by Cardiak